Rineloricaria catamarcensis is a species of catfish in the family Loricariidae. It is native to South America, where it occurs in the basins of the Tala River and the Salí River in Catamarca Province in Argentina. The species reaches 11 cm (4.3 inches) in length and is believed to be a facultative air-breather.

References 

Fish described in 1895
Catfish of South America
Loricariidae
Fish of Argentina